Brigadier General George Mortimer Morris CB DSO (1871–1954) was a senior British Indian Army officer during the First World War.

Biography

Born on 22 August 1871, George Mortimer Morris was educated at Bedford School. He received his first commission as a Second Lieutenant in the Devonshire Regiment in 1890, and was promoted to the rank of Captain in the British Indian Army in 1901. He served in Mesopotamia during the First World War, between 1914 and 1918, where he was Commander of the 55th Indian Brigade.

Brigadier General George Mortimer Morris was appointed a Companion of the Distinguished Service Order in 1917, and as a Commander of the Order of the Bath in 1919. He died in Litton Cheney, Dorset, on 24 April 1954, aged 86.

References

1871 births
1954 deaths
People educated at Bedford School
Companions of the Distinguished Service Order
Companions of the Order of the Bath
Indian Army personnel of World War I
British Indian Army officers